Music Pool 2002 is the first live album by Hitomi Yada, released on 19 February 2003. 
The full title is Aozora Records Music Pool 2002 performed by Yaeko, as this event was an exposition of Aozora Records' artists at the time performing around and with Yada. Recorded in the Osaka International Expo Park, it features appearances by both Imogen Heap and Daishi Kataoka (Aozora and Yada producer and solo artist).

The CD was released with an accompanying DVD of the concert, which included promotional videos for both Heap and Kataoka.
Songs by both Heap and Kataoka appear at the end of the CD. The artwork was produced by Yada herself.

The audio version of Life's Like a love song seen on the DVD can be found as the bonus track on the Limited-edition Japanese release of i/fancy.

Track list

References
 Hitomi Yada discography 
 

Hitomi Yaida albums
2003 compilation albums
2003 video albums
Music video compilation albums
2003 live albums
Live video albums